Gråsten Palace  is located at Gråsten in the Jutland region of southern Denmark. It is best known for being the summer residence of the Danish Royal Family.  The main house has a modern, all-white facade, with Venetian doors opening onto sweeping, manicured lawns and gravel walkways. The grounds include a huge stables court.

History
Gråsten  was in its first edition a small hunting castle built in the middle of the 16th century. 
After about three and a half succeeding centuries of ownership by Danish nobles, Gråsten Slot was taken over by the State, extensively restored, and by 1935, it was the summer residence for then-Crown Prince Frederik, later King Frederik IX, and Crown Princess Ingrid, later Queen Ingrid, who adored the palace until her death in November 2000. It is the usual venue for the royal family's official summer photo shoot.

In November 1845, Hans Christian Andersen visited Duke Christian August II at Gråsten Castle.
Legend had it that Gråsten Palace was where Andersen wrote The Little Match Girl, during his visit. However that is not the case.  Andersen wrote it when he visited Augustenborg Palace.

Landscape and Palace Chapel 
The property includes a stables court, manicured lawns, and gravel walkways.

Graasten Palace Chapel in the north wing  is the only building remaining from the original baroque palace after a 1757 fire. 
Despite a badly damaged interior from the Second Schleswig War, the chapel is decorated with 80 paintings. The chapel has bilingual congregations, with German and Danish services to accommodate the mix of local culture.

References

External links
 Gråsten Palace and Palace Gardens Agency for Palaces and Cultural Properties 
 Gråsten Palace Church 

Palaces in Denmark
Royal residences in Denmark
Castles in the Region of Southern Denmark
Listed buildings and structures in Sønderborg Municipality